"Dark Horse" is a song by Canadian pop singer Amanda Marshall. Co-written by Dean McTaggart and David Tyson, it was the fifth single released from Marshall's 1995 self-titled debut album and became another hit for her in Canada, reaching number five on the RPM Top Singles chart and peaking atop the RPM Adult Contemporary chart. It also became a minor hit in Australia and Germany. In 1997, American country music singer Mila Mason covered the song for her own debut album, That's Enough of That. Her version reached number 21 on the US Billboard Hot Country Songs chart and number 12 on the Canadian RPM Country Tracks chart.

Critical reception
Colin Larkin, in The Encyclopedia of Popular Music, wrote that it was "more personal" than the other story songs on Marshall's album. Jeremy Helligar of Entertainment Weekly said that Marshall "drums up momentum with the gently percussive 'Dark Horse'". While not a music critic, Elton John remarked on The Rosie O'Donnell Show that "Dark Horse" was a "guaranteed hit" after he mentioned that he was listening to Amanda Marshall's album.

Chart performance
On Canada's RPM 100 Hit Tracks chart, "Dark Horse" debuted at number 74 on January 13, 1997, and peaked at number five nine weeks later, on the issue of March 17, 1997. The single also peaked at number one on the same publication's Adult Contemporary chart two weeks later. It was the 27th-most successful song of 1997 in Canada and the third-most successful adult contemporary hit of the year in the country. The song also charted within the lower reaches on the charts of Australia and Germany, making it to numbers 70 and 93 respectively. Despite its low peak on the German chart, it stayed in the top 100 for six nonconsecutive weeks.

Track listings
UK CD single
 "Dark Horse" (edit)
 "Let It Rain" (live)
 "Birmingham" (live)
 "This Could Take All Night"

European maxi-CD single
 "Dark Horse" (edit) – 4:29
 "Let It Rain" (live) – 6:12
 "Birmingham" (live) – 7:46

Charts

Weekly charts

Year-end charts

Mila Mason version

Mila Mason's version appears on her 1996 debut album That's Enough of That. It was the second single from the album, entering the charts in February 1997.

Critical reception
Brian Wahlert of Country Standard Time described Mason's cover as "the least country song on the album" but said that "Mason's smoky voice works perfectly on the opening lyric […] and the pretty ensuing story of young love that lasted."

Chart performance
Mason's version of the song spent 20 weeks on the Billboard Hot Country Songs charts, peaking at number 21. In Canada, it peaked at number 12 on the RPM Country Tracks charts dated for May 12, 1997.

Weekly charts

Year-end charts

References

1995 singles
1995 songs
1996 singles
1997 singles
Amanda Marshall songs
Atlantic Records singles
Epic Records singles
Mila Mason songs
Songs written by David Tyson
Songs written by Dean McTaggart